Aida Marianne Mollenkamp (born April 15, 1980) is a cook, television personality, and food writer from Manhattan Beach, California.

Early life
Mollenkamp grew up in Southern California and attended Rolling Hills Country Day and Chadwick School in Los Angeles. Before she got interested in cooking, she played soccer, tennis, did classical ballet, and other extracurricular activities including music and volunteering. In high school, a skiing accident rendered her temporarily unable to dance and she turned to cooking as a means of expressing herself creatively.

Education and career
Mollenkamp attended the Cornell Hotel School and graduated with a B.S. in hospitality management from Cornell University.  Following this, she worked in hospitality real estate consulting at Ernst & Young, then moved to Europe, living between Florence, Italy and Paris, France for two years. She attended culinary school and received a Grand Diplôme from Le Cordon Bleu in Paris in 2004. Over the years, she has worked at several restaurants and hotels in the United States, including Chez Melange, California Pizza Kitchen, and the Hotel Bel-Air, in Los Angeles, California. Following her return to the U.S. in 2005, Mollenkamp became an editor at the San Francisco, California-based CHOW.com online food magazine.

Food Network and Cooking Channel
Mollenkamp's first Food Network series, the interactive cooking program Ask Aida, began airing on August 2, 2008 and filmed three seasons. Her second show, FoodCrafters for Food Network's new sister network, Cooking Channel, debuted May 31, 2010. In FoodCrafters, she leaves the kitchen to uncover handmade food finds from around the nation.

Keys To The Kitchen Cookbook
Her first cookbook, Keys To The Kitchen: The Essential Reference for Becoming A More Accomplished, Adventurous Cook, was published by Chronicle Books in October 2012.

Family
Mollenkamp's mother is Italian American and her stepmother is French, both of whom helped foster her passion for cooking while she was growing up. Her father is of Lebanese origin. Mollenkamp's cooking style is influenced by her family's origins yet it also was shaped by the multi-ethnic nature of Los Angeles, where she grew up. She has prepared recipes on her show inspired by her family, including her sister Ivy and their grandmother. Mollenkamp's brother, Christophe Lindstrom, was shown on the Dear Food Network Grilling episode titled "Grilling in Paradise."

References

External links

Aida Mollenkamp biography
Aida Mollenkamp official website
Aida Mollenkamp LinkedIn Profile
Aida Mollenkamp Twitter page
Aida Mollenkamp Facebook Page
Aida Mollenkamp Pinterest Page
Aida Mollenkamp Keys To The Kitchen Cookbook Page

1980 births
Alumni of Le Cordon Bleu
American expatriates in France
American expatriates in Italy
American people of Italian descent
American people of German descent
American people of Lebanese descent
Cornell University School of Hotel Administration alumni
Food Network chefs
Living people
Writers from Los Angeles